WEZX (106.9 FM, "Rock 107") is a commercial radio station licensed to serve Scranton, Pennsylvania. The station is owned by Times-Shamrock Communications, through licensee Scranton Times, L.P., and broadcasts a classic rock format.

WEZX programming is simulcast on WPZX 105.9 FM in Pocono Pines, Pennsylvania, WFUZ 1240 AM in Wilkes-Barre, and on seven translators. The station's programming is also available via streaming on the station's website.

WEZX uses HD Radio, and simulcasts sister station WQFM on its HD2 subchannel.

History
The station signed on for the first time in 1967. In the early 1970s, Times-Shamrock branded the station "FM 107" with a soft rock format. The format was changed to rock in 1980 and the station rebranded as "Rock 107".

In 2000, sister station WPZX began simulcasting WEZX programming, followed by WVZX (now WHNB) in 2007.

WEZX celebrated 30 years as "Rock 107" in 2010.

The station commenced digital broadcasting on August 15, 2011.

Weekend themes
Rock 107 used to feature a theme each weekend from Friday afternoon to Sunday at midnight, but it's sometimes extended for holiday weekends such as Memorial Day weekend. Some popular themes include:

Nice Pair Weekend - Blocks of two songs by the same artist are played through the weekend.
Perfect Ten Weekend - Listeners submit lists of ten songs via e-mail (often following a certain theme, i.e. "songs about cars", "Halloween songs", or simply their personal top ten songs). The lists are played throughout the week.
Time Travel Weekend - When the clocks change for Daylight Saving Time the station plays blocks of songs from the same year. Blocks can be as short as 3 songs and sometimes longer than 10 songs. Time machine sound effects and facts about each year are included.
British Invasion Weekend - Primarily music from the British Invasion Era is played throughout the week, often accompanied by history of the era.
Flashback Weekend - Music from a specific span of time is played throughout the weekend. Often historic highlights from the year, quotes from movies popular during the era, and music facts are also aired.
Block Party (Rock Block) Weekend - Similarly to the Nice Pair Weekend, blocks of songs by the same artist (three to six) are aired throughout the weekend.
All Request Weekend - Listener requested songs are featured through the weekend.
Oh Wow Weekend - Songs that are rarely played or are believed to have personal significance for many people are played, with the intention of giving listeners an "oh, wow." feeling, for not hearing them in a while.

Simulcasts and translators
Two full-power stations are licensed to simulcast the programming of WEZX:

WEZX programming is broadcast on the following translators:

References

External links

EZX
Classic rock radio stations in the United States
Radio stations established in 1975